"Seventh Heaven" is the thirty-first single by L'Arc-en-Ciel, released on May 30, 2007. It reached number 1 on the Oricon chart. The b-side "Honey 2007" is a rewritten version of their eleventh single "Honey", and is the sixth appearance of their alter ego, P'unk-en-Ciel.
The single's music video was nominated for the MTV Video Music Award Japan for Best Rock Video in 2008.

Track listing

References

2007 singles
L'Arc-en-Ciel songs
Oricon Weekly number-one singles
Songs written by Hyde (musician)
2007 songs
Ki/oon Music singles